Chintamani is a neighbourhood of the city of Tiruchirappalli in Tamil Nadu, India.

Neighbourhoods and suburbs of Tiruchirappalli